Rafael Tolói  (born 10 October 1990) is a professional footballer who plays as a centre-back and a defensive right-back for  club Atalanta and the Italy national team.

Tolói represented his native country of Brazil internationally at the under-20 level in 2009, but switched allegiance at the senior grade to Italy in 2021 after meeting FIFA's five-year residency requirement. He had been living in Italy since his move to Atalanta early in the 2015–16 season, and had years earlier acquired Italian citizenship, for which he was eligible because his great grandparents hailed from Treviso, Veneto. He made his senior debut for Italy in 2021, and represented the nation at their victorious UEFA Euro 2020 campaign.

Club career

Goiás
Born in Glória d'Oeste, Mato Grosso, he started playing for Goiás Esporte Clube in 2008, and helped his club win the Campeonato Goiano in 2009. Tolói played 17 Série B games for Goiás and scored two goals. He reached the 2010 Copa Sudamericana finals with the green team.

São Paulo
On 5 July 2012, São Paulo FC confirmed Tolói in their squad, with the defender signing a five-year contract. He scored his first goal for São Paulo on 25 July 2012 in a match against Atlético Goianiense.

On 3 August 2013, Tolói scored the goal that confirmed the title of Eusébio Cup for São Paulo FC, in a 2–0 victory against S.L. Benfica.

Loan to Roma
On 31 January 2014, Tolói was loaned to Serie A side A.S. Roma for the remainder of the 2013–14 season for a fee of €500,000. The move was agreed with an option to buy for a total value of €5.5 million. He made his debut for the Giallorossi in their 2–1 win against Torino on 25 March 2014, playing the full 90 minutes in place of the suspended Medhi Benatia.

Atalanta
On 26 August 2015, Tolói was signed by Atalanta B.C. for a €3.5 million transfer fee. He made his debut on 13 September, in a 2–2 league draw at Sassuolo, replacing Gianpaolo Bellini in the 80th minute. In his second match, eleven days later, he started and scored the sole goal, settling a 1–0 league win at Empoli.

On 22 February 2018, Tolói scored for the first time in a UEFA competition, against Borussia Dortmund in the Europa League round of 32. The match ended in a 1–1 draw, which was not enough to see Atalanta through the next round after a 3–2 defeat in the first leg.

Tolói became Atalanta's captain during the 2020–21 season, following the departure of his predecessor Papu Gómez from the club.

International career
Tolói represented Brazil at the under-20 level, winning the South American Championship and placing second in the World Cup in 2009.

Having satisfied its eligibility rules by possessing Italian citizenship, residing in Italy for five years, and never representing Brazil at the senior level, FIFA approved Tolói's switch of international allegiance to Italy on 17 February 2021. He was subsequently named to the Italian squad by manager Roberto Mancini on March 19, 2021, and made his debut on the 31st in the 2022 FIFA World Cup qualifier against Lithuania, playing the entire match in a 2–0 away victory.

On 1 June 2021, Tolói was named by manager Roberto Mancini in the 26-man Italy squad for the UEFA Euro 2020. In Italy's second group match on 16 June, he made his first appearance of the tournament, coming on as a second half substitute for Domenico Berardi, and setting up Ciro Immobile's goal in a 3–0 win over Switzerland, which allowed Italy to advance to the round of 16. On 11 July, Tolói won the European Championship with Italy following a 3–2 penalty shoot-out victory over England at Wembley Stadium in the final, after a 1–1 draw in extra-time.

Style of play
Tolói is a physically strong defender, who is mainly known for his anticipation. Although usually a centre-back, he is also capable of playing as a right-back, and is known for his ability to contribute offensively as well as defensively.

Career statistics

Club

International

Honours
Goiás
 Campeonato Goiano: 2009, 2012

São Paulo
 Copa Sudamericana: 2012

Italy
 UEFA European Championship: 2020

Orders
 5th Class / Knight: Cavaliere Ordine al Merito della Repubblica Italiana: 2021

References

External links

Profile at the Atalanta B.C. website

1990 births
Living people
Sportspeople from Mato Grosso
Citizens of Italy through descent
Brazilian people of Italian descent
Italian people of Brazilian descent
Brazilian footballers
Brazil under-20 international footballers
Italian footballers
Italy international footballers
Association football defenders
Campeonato Brasileiro Série A players
Campeonato Brasileiro Série B players
Goiás Esporte Clube players
São Paulo FC players
Serie A players
A.S. Roma players
Atalanta B.C. players
UEFA Euro 2020 players
UEFA European Championship-winning players
Knights of the Order of Merit of the Italian Republic